John Ratzenberger's Made in America is an American documentary television series hosted by John Ratzenberger. The series premiered January 6, 2004, on the Travel Channel. Ratzenberger visits various American manufacturers, taking the show's viewers along on the tours and showing how various everyday items are made. The show has visited a variety of factories, including Crayola, Airstream, Yankee Candle, Samuel Adams Brewery, Ruger, Delta Faucet Company, and Rodgers Instruments.

Episodes

References

External links

John Ratzenberger Official Website

2000s American documentary television series
2004 American television series debuts
Travel Channel original programming
2008 American television series endings